Aedoeadaptatus is a monotypic genus in the family of Peptoniphilaceae. The only described species is Aedoeadaptatus acetigenes.

References

Monotypic bacteria genera
Peptoniphilaceae
Bacteria described in 2022